General elections were held in the Netherlands on 1 September 1887.

Results

By district
  Liberal  
  Conservative  
  Anti-Revolutionary  
  Catholic

Notes

References

General elections in the Netherlands
Netherlands
1887 in the Netherlands
September 1887 events
Election and referendum articles with incomplete results